Black French may refer to:

 Black French people
 Immigration to France